Fred Milton Hatch (October 28, 1877 – December 25, 1932) was an American football coach.

Hatch was born October 28, 1877, in Bureau County, Illinois and grew up near Creston, Iowa. He attended the Oberlin Academy from 1896 to 1898. In 1898 enrolled at Oberlin College, from which he graduated in 1902. He was the captain of the football team in 1900 and of the track team in 1902. After graduation, he taught and coached several sports at Valley City State Normal School—now known as Valley City State University in North Dakota and at Alma College in Michigan. Newspaper records suggest his basketball teams were particularly successful. On September 10, 1907, he was appointed football coach at West High School in Cleveland. In 1910 he gave up teaching and became a railway postal clerk based in Oberlin, Ohio. He continued to coach in various local organizations for some years.

Hatch married his Oberlin College Classmate, Ellen Hayden Birdseye, on September 28, 1905. Exactly one year after their marriage their only son, George Birdseye, was born. Hatch  died on December 25, 1932, in Oberlin, Ohio.

Coaching career 
Hatch was the head football coach at Alma College in Alma, Michigan. He held that position for the 1902 season. His coaching record at Alma was 7–1 and his squad was declared conference champions for the Michigan Intercollegiate Athletic Association.

References

1877 births
1932 deaths
Alma Scots football coaches
Oberlin Yeomen football players
High school football coaches in Ohio
People from Bureau County, Illinois
People from Creston, Iowa